Oscar Onley (born 13 October 2002) is a Scottish cyclist, who currently rides for UCI WorldTeam . 

Major results

2020
 5th Chrono des Nations Juniors
 7th Overall Ain Bugey Valromey Tour
 8th Overall Aubel–Thimister–Stavelot
1st Stage 2a (TTT)
2021
 3rd Time trial, National Under-23 Road Championships
2022
 Giro della Valle d'Aosta
1st  Points classification
1st Stage 5
 3rd Overall CRO Race
1st  Young rider classification
 5th Overall Circuit des Ardennes
 7th Overall Sazka Tour
 9th Overall Giro Ciclistico d'Italia
2023
 1st  Young rider classification, Volta ao Algarve

References

External links

2002 births
Living people
Scottish male cyclists
People from Kelso, Scottish Borders